Nephrotoma suturalis is a species of tiger crane fly. Both the nominate subspecies, N. s. suturalis, and N. s. wulpiana have been recorded in the Southeastern United States.

References

External links 
 
 

Tipulidae
Taxa named by Hermann Loew
Diptera of North America
Diptera of South America